"Are You with Me" is a song by American country singer Easton Corbin. The song first appeared on Corbin's second studio album, All Over the Road (2012). It was later included on Corbin's third studio album, About to Get Real (2015). A remix by Belgian DJ Lost Frequencies was released in 2014, and in 2016 Corbin released the version from About to Get Real as a single of his own.

Background and writing
The song was written on May 4, 2011, at Terry McBride's cabin in Franklin, Tennessee.

Chart performance
Reaching a peak of number 41 on the Billboard Country Airplay charts, "Are You with Me" became Corbin's first single to miss the top 40 and his lowest-peaking release to date. It has sold 101,000 copies in the United States as of August 2016.

Lost Frequencies version

In 2014, Belgian DJ and record producer Lost Frequencies took the music and the refrain from the song, speeding up the track and releasing it in October 2014 as a remix. The song reached number one on Belgium's Ultratop Flanders chart and peaked at number two on Belgium's Wallonia francophone chart. In July 2015, the single topped the charts in the United Kingdom making Lost Frequencies the first Belgian artist to top the UK chart. The song also topped the charts in other countries, including Germany, Ireland, Switzerland, Australia and Austria.

Formats and track listings
Digital download – Radio edit
 "Are You with Me" (radio edit) – 2:18
Digital download – Remixes
 "Are You with Me" (Kungs Radio Edit) – 3:08
 "Are You with Me" (Kungs Remix) – 3:54
 "Are You with Me" (Funk D Radio Edit) – 3:30
 "Are You with Me" (Funk D Remix) – 4:02
 "Are You with Me" (Harold van Lennep Piano Edit) – 2:56
 "Are You with Me" (Dash Berlin Remix)  – 4:50
Beatport download – Remixes (The Bearded Man)
 "Are You with Me" (Kungs Remix) – 3:54
 "Are You with Me" (Harold van Lennep Piano Edit) – 2:56
Beatport download – Remixes (Armada Music)
 "Are You with Me" (DIMARO Remix) – 4:22
 "Are You with Me" (Funk D Remix) – 4:02
Beatport download – Remixes (Armada Deep)
 "Are You with Me" (Pretty Pink Remix) – 7:01
 "Are You with Me" (Gianni Kosta Remix) – 4:40
Beatport download – Dash Berlin Remix (Armada Trice and Ultra Music)
 "Are You with Me" (Dash Berlin Remix)  – 4:49
Beatport download – Remixes Two (The Bearded Man)
 "Are You with Me" (DJ Fresh Remix) – 4:39
 "Are You with Me" (Calvo Remix) – 4:36
 "Are You with Me" (Tom Budin Remix) – 4:05
 "Are You with Me" (Mandel and Forbes Sunset Remix) – 7:32
 "Are You with Me" (Glover Remix) – 4:31
 "Are You with Me" (Monarchs Remix)  – 3:55
 "Are You with Me" (Freejak Remix) – 4:59
 "Are You with Me" ('86 Club Mix) – 5:41
 "Are You with Me" (Gestort Aber Geil Remix) – 5:16
 "Are You with Me" (DBN Remix) – 5:16
 "Are You with Me" (Cropper Remix) – 6:19

Charts

Weekly charts

Year-end charts

Decade-end charts

Certifications

See also
List of Airplay 100 number ones of the 2010s

References

2012 songs
2014 singles
2016 singles
Easton Corbin songs
Lost Frequencies songs
Songs written by Tommy Lee James
Songs written by Terry McBride (musician)
Songs written by Shane McAnally
Song recordings produced by Carson Chamberlain
Number-one singles in Austria
Ultratop 50 Singles (Flanders) number-one singles
Number-one singles in Germany
Number-one singles in Greece
Number-one singles in Israel
Number-one singles in Poland
Number-one singles in Romania
Number-one singles in Scotland
Number-one singles in Sweden
Number-one singles in Switzerland
Irish Singles Chart number-one singles
UK Singles Chart number-one singles
Tropical house songs